The Battle of Kraśnik started on August 23, 1914, in the province of Galicia and the adjacent areas across the border in the Russian Empire, in northern Austria (in present-day Poland), and ended two days later. The Austro-Hungarian First Army defeated the Russian Fourth Army. It was the first victory by Austria-Hungary in World War I. As a result, the First Army's commander, General Viktor Dankl, was (briefly) lauded as a national hero for his success. The battle was also the first of a series of engagements between Austria-Hungary and Russia all along the Galicia front.

Initial deployment 
According to Prit Buttar, "The Austro-Hungarian empire, whose conflict with Serbia lay at the heart of the tensions that plunged the continent into war, initially intended to strike a swift blow against Serbia before the Russians could complete mobilisation...when hostilities did begin, Conrad and his colleagues found themselves coerced by Germany to alter their plans and attack Russia. This was in order to reduce pressure on Germany, thus allowing her to complete a planned victory over France."

The Austro-Hungarian Chief of Staff, Conrad established his headquarters in the Przemyśl Fortress. Armies under his command included Dankl's First Army, east of Sandomierz, with the I, V, and X Corps of 10 infantry divisions, 2 cavalry divisions, and an infantry brigade. North of Przemyśl was Auffenberg's Fourth Army, with the II, VI, IX, and XVII Corps of 9 infantry divisions, and 2 cavalry divisions.  East of Przemyśl was Brudermann's Third Army, with the III, XI and XIV Corps of 18 infantry divisions and 4 cavalry divisions. Heinrich Rittmeister Kummer von Falkenfeld commanded an Army Group on the western flank, with 2 infantry and 1 cavalry divisions.  Kövess commanded an Army Group on the eastern flank, consisting of XII Corps.  The Second Army, commanded by Eduard von Böhm-Ermolli, was still en route from the Serbian Front.

The Russian Southwestern Front was under the command of Nikolai Iudovich Ivanov. His forces included Saltza's Fourth Army with the Grenadier Corps, XIV and XVI Corps of 6 infantry divisions, 3 cavalry divisions, plus an infantry and cavalry brigade. To the east was Plehve's Fifth Army, with the V, XVII, XIX and XXV Corps of 10 infantry and 5 cavalry divisions. Further east was Nikolai Ruzsky's Third Army with the IX, X, XI, and XXI Corps of 12 infantry and 4 cavalry divisions. On the Russian eastern flanks was Aleksei Brusilov's Eighth Army with the VII, VIII, XII and XXIV Corps of 10 infantry and 5 cavalry divisions. The Russians' battle plan, based on information provided by Alfred Redl, assumed the Austro-Hungarian concentration of forces would be east of the River San.

On 19 August, Edmund Ritter von Zaremba's Austro-Hungarian 4th Cavalry Division, encountered Keller's Russian 10th Cavalry Division east of Lemberg. According to Buttar, "It would rank as the largest cavalry-versus-cavalry battle of the entire war." However, it had no impact on subsequent events, and none of the cavalry reconnaissance by either side resulted in useful information.  On 22 August, Saltza's Russian Fourth Army advanced into Galicia and took up positions southeast of Lublin.  Simultaneously, the Austro-Hungarian armies crossed the Tanew.

Battle 
Going into the battle of Kraśnik, the Austro-Hungarian forces enjoyed two key advantages over their Russian opponents: superior numbers and a better strategic position. Dankl's First Army enjoyed a numerical advantage of ten and a half infantry and two cavalry divisions to Baron Salza's six and a half infantry and three and a half cavalry divisions. Chief of Staff Conrad's orders for the First Army further compounded Austro-Hungarian superiority by placing a larger than expected concentration of force further west than Ivanov and Russian Chief of Staff, General Alexeyev, had expected. On August 22, Alexeyev issued orders to his Fourth and Fifth Armies in an attempt to improve their position in the crash course they were now headed, aimed at a larger, flanking pair of armies. While these orders probably saved the Russian Fourth Army from a possible much worse defeat, it failed to change the nearly pre-ordained outcome of the battle.

On 23 August, at 9 a.m., Dankl's First Army I Corps encountered the Russian Fourth Army XIV Corps, 18th Infantry Division, near Zaklików, while the Austro-Hungarian 3rd Cavalry Division engaged the Russian 13th Cavalry Division further to the west. At mid-day, Dankl's First Army V Corps engaged the Russian Army XIV Corps, 45th Infantry division, and was able to secure Polichna.  By the end of the day, the Russian Fourth Army XIV Corps was driven back in disarray, exposing the western flank of the Russian Southwestern Front.

On 24 August, the Russian Fourth Army Grenadier Corps and XVI Corps continued their advance south, unaware that Ivanov ordered the Fourth Army to hold its position, while his Fifth Army turned the eastern Austro-Hungarian flank. The Russian corps encountered the Austro-Hungarian V and X Corps, fighting most of the day until afternoon, when the Russian XVI Corps retreated to Kraśnik. The Austro-Hungarian I Corps continued their advance to Urzędów. Saltza withdrew to Lublin during the night.

Aftermath 
Once routed, the Russians began a retreat towards Lublin with the also defeated Fifth Russian Army which had lost at Komarów. The victorious Austro-Hungarian forces followed, inflicting further losses on the Russians. Prit Buttar estimates 15,000 Austro-Hungarian casualties and 25,000 Russian, including 6,000 taken prisoner. In 1917, Dankl was honoured with the Commanders' Cross of the Military Order of Maria Theresa, and advanced to the title of Graf Dankl von Kraśnik. Slatza was removed as the Fourth Army commander and replaced by Aleksei Evert.

Notes

References

External links 
 Colonel General Viktor Graf Dankl von Krasnik
 Dankl
 Mannerheim in World War I

Krasnik, Battle of
Krasnik
Krasnik
Krasnik
Kingdom of Galicia and Lodomeria
Lublin Governorate
1914 in Austria-Hungary
1914 in the Russian Empire